is a Japanese politician of the Constitutional Democratic Party of Japan, and a member of the House of Representatives in the Diet (national legislature). He is a former member of the Democratic Party (DP), the Democratic Party of Japan (DPJ), and New Party Sakigake. After he joined the DPJ in 1996, he was elected to the House of Representatives.

He joined the  Chunichi Shimbun, a major left-leaning, progressive and social-democratic general newspaper, in 1984 and left the company in 1993.

References

External links 
 Official website in Japanese.

Living people
1958 births
Sophia University alumni
People from Nagoya
21st-century Japanese politicians
Members of the House of Representatives from Aichi Prefecture
Constitutional Democratic Party of Japan politicians
Democratic Party of Japan politicians
Chunichi Shimbun people